This is a list of schools in Calderdale in the English county of West Yorkshire.

State-funded schools

Primary schools

 Abbey Park Academy, Illingworth
 All Saints' CE Junior and Infant School, Halifax
 Ash Green Community Primary School, Mixenden
 Bailiffe Bridge Junior and Infant School, Bailiff Bridge
 Barkisland CE Primary School, Barkisland
 Beech Hill School, Halifax
 Bolton Brow Primary Academy, Sowerby Bridge
 Bowling Green Academy, Stainland
 Bradshaw Primary School, Bradshaw
 Burnley Road Academy, Mytholmroyd
 Calder Primary School, Mytholmroyd
 Carr Green Primary School, Rastrick
 Castle Hill Primary School, Todmorden
 Central Street Infant School, Hebden Bridge
 Christ Church CE Junior School, Sowerby Bridge
 Christ Church CE Primary School, Pellon
 Cliffe Hill Community Primary School, Lightcliffe
 Colden Junior and Infant School, Colden
 Copley Primary School, Copley
 Cornholme Junior and Infant School, Cornholme
 Cross Lane Primary School, Elland
 Dean Field Community Primary School, Ovenden
 Elland CE Junior and Infant School, Elland
 Ferney Lee Primary School, Todmorden
 Field Lane Primary School, Rastrick
 The Greetland Academy, Greetland
 The Halifax Academy, Halifax
 Hebden Royd CE Primary School, Hebden Bridge
 Heptonstall Junior and Infant School, Heptonstall
 Holy Trinity CE Primary School, Halifax
 Holywell Green Primary School, Holywell Green
 Lee Mount Primary School, Lee Mount
 Lightcliffe CE Primary School, Lightcliffe
 Ling Bob Junior and Infant School, Pellon
 Longroyde Junior School, Rastrick
 Luddenden CE School, Luddendenfoot
 Luddendenfoot Academy, Luddendenfoot
 Midgley School, Midgley
 Moorside Community Primary School, Ovenden
 Mount Pellon Primary Academy, Halifax
 New Road Primary School, Sowerby Bridge
 Norland CE School, Norland
 Northowram Primary School, Northowram
 Old Earth Primary School, Elland
 Old Town Primary School, Wadsworth
 Parkinson Lane Community Primary School, Halifax
 Ripponden Junior and Infant School, Ripponden
 Riverside Junior School, Hebden Bridge
 Sacred Heart RC Academy, Sowerby Bridge
 St Andrew's CE Infant School, Brighouse
 St Andrew's CE Junior School, Brighouse
 St Augustine's CE School, Halifax
 St John's CE Primary Academy, Clifton
 St John's RC Primary School, Rishworth
 St Joseph's RC Primary Academy, Brighouse
 St Joseph's RC Primary Academy, Halifax
 St Joseph's RC Primary Academy, Todmorden
 St Malachy's RC Primary School, Illingworth
 St Mary's CE Junior and Infant School, Sowerby Bridge
 St Mary's RC Primary Academy, Halifax
 St Michael and All Angels CE Primary School, Shelf
 St Patrick's RC Primary Academy, Elland
 Salterhebble Junior and Infant School, Halifax
 Salterlee Primary School, Shibden
 Savile Park Primary School, Halifax
 Scout Road Academy, Mytholmroyd
 Shade Primary School, Todmorden
 Shelf Junior and Infant School, Shelf
 Siddal Primary School, Halifax
 Stubbings Infant School, Hebden Bridge
 Todmorden CE Junior and Infant School, Todmorden
 Triangle CE Primary School, Triangle
 Trinity Academy Akroydon, Halifax
 Trinity Academy St Chad's, Brighouse
 Trinity Academy St Peter's, Sowerby
 Tuel Lane Infant School, Sowerby Bridge
 Wainstalls School, Wainstalls
 Walsden St Peter's CE Primary School, Walsden
 Warley Road Primary Academy, Halifax
 Warley Town School, Warley
 West Vale Primary School, West Vale
 Whitehill Community Academy, Illingworth
 Withinfields Primary School, Southowram
 Woodhouse Primary School, Brighouse

Non-selective secondary schools

Brighouse High School, Brighouse
The Brooksbank School, Elland
Calder High School, Mytholmroyd
The Halifax Academy, Halifax
Lightcliffe Academy, Lightcliffe
Park Lane Academy, Exley
Rastrick High School, Rastrick
Ryburn Valley High School, Sowerby
Todmorden High School, Todmorden
Trinity Academy Grammar, Sowerby Bridge
Trinity Academy, Halifax, Halifax

Grammar schools
The Crossley Heath School, Halifax
North Halifax Grammar School, Illingworth

Special and alternative schools
Highbury School, Rastrick
Ravenscliffe High School, Halifax
Wood Bank School, Luddendenfoot
The Whitley AP Academy, Illingworth

Further education
Calderdale College
The Maltings College
Trinity Sixth Form Academy

Independent schools

Primary and preparatory schools
Beacon Lights Schools, Halifax
The Gleddings School, Halifax

Senior and all-through schools
Hipperholme Grammar School, Hipperholme
Rishworth School, Rishworth

Special and alternative schools

Brearley Hall School, Luddendenfoot
Broadwood High School, Pellon
Compass Community School North, Elland
Compass Community School Willow Park, Sowerby Bridge
Endeavour House School, Moor End
Millcourt School, Shelf
Nightingale House School, Cragg Vale
Riverbank Primary School, Ripponden
Stafford Hall School, Halifax
William Henry Smith School, Brighouse

Calderdale
Schools in Calderdale
Schools